Triple-L-Trailer Court is an unincorporated community in Alberta, Canada within the County of Grande Prairie No. 1 that is recognized as a designated place by Statistics Canada.

Demographics 

See also 
List of communities in Alberta
List of designated places in Alberta

References 

Designated places in Alberta
Localities in the County of Grande Prairie No. 1